Arthur James McEvoy (May 6, 1882 – October 11, 1941) was a Canadian politician. Long time town councillor and then mayor, he served in the Legislative Assembly of New Brunswick as member of the Progressive Conservative party from 1939 to his death in 1941.

References

1882 births
1941 deaths
20th-century Canadian politicians
Canadian accountants
Progressive Conservative Party of New Brunswick MLAs
American emigrants to Canada
People from Marblehead, Massachusetts